Ahsan Asadullah (born December 8, 1998) is an American college basketball player for the Lipscomb Bisons of the ASUN Conference.

High school career
Asadullah played basketball for North Clayton High School in College Park, Georgia. As a senior, he averaged 15.1 points and 10 rebounds per game, leading his team to a Region 4-3A runner-up finish. He committed to playing college basketball for Lipscomb over offers from Georgia State, Little Rock, James Madison, Bucknell, Brown and Alcorn State.

College career
Asadullah redshirted his first season at Lipscomb because of a knee injury. As a freshman, he averaged 7.4 points and 4.6 rebounds per game, receiving ASUN Conference All-Freshman Team honors. On March 3, 2020, at the ASUN tournament quarterfinals, Asadullah posted a career-high 40 points and 14 rebounds in a 68–63 win against Florida Gulf Coast. He set the Allen Arena single-game scoring record. As a sophomore, he averaged 18.6 points, 10.1 rebounds and 3.9 assists per game, earning First Team All-ASUN honors. On December 12, 2020, Asadullah recorded a junior season-high 29 points and 11 rebounds in an 81–71 loss to Belmont. As a junior, he averaged 14.1 points, eight rebounds and 3.4 assists per game, repeating as a First Team All-ASUN selection. He led all NCAA Division I centers in assists. Asadullah was named to the First Team All-ASUN for the third season as a senior.

Career statistics

College

|-
| style="text-align:left;"| 2017–18
| style="text-align:left;"| Lipscomb
| style="text-align:center;" colspan="11"|  Redshirt
|-
| style="text-align:left;"| 2018–19
| style="text-align:left;"| Lipscomb
| 37 || 2 || 14.2 || .565 || – || .676 || 4.6 || .8 || .6 || .6 || 7.4
|-
| style="text-align:left;"| 2019–20
| style="text-align:left;"| Lipscomb
| 31 || 30 || 29.8 || .520 || .200 || .519 || 10.1 || 3.9 || 1.2 || 1.2 || 18.6
|-
| style="text-align:left;"| 2020–21
| style="text-align:left;"| Lipscomb
| 27 || 27 || 28.3 || .579 || .000 || .505 || 8.0 || 3.4 || .9 || .6 || 14.1
|- class="sortbottom"
| style="text-align:center;" colspan="2"| Career
| 95 || 59 || 23.3 || .546 || .188 || .550 || 7.4 || 2.6 || .9 || .8 || 13.0

Personal life
Asadullah's father, Jalal, played college basketball for Akron. His oldest brother, Marcus Georges-Hunt, played for Georgia Tech before embarking on a professional career, including in the NBA. Another older brother, Jalal Johnson, competed for Lindenwood.

References

External links
Lipscomb Bisons bio

1998 births
Living people
American men's basketball players
Basketball players from Atlanta
Centers (basketball)
Lipscomb Bisons men's basketball players
American people of Virgin Islands descent